Glen Strathallan was a British ship originally built as a trawler, but then converted into a private yacht, which also served in the Royal Navy in World War II. She was finally scuttled in 1970 at Plymouth Sound, England as a diver training site.

Ship history
The ship was built in 1928 by Cochrane & Sons of Selby, Yorkshire, as a steam fishing trawler and registered at Glasgow as F/V Glen Strathallan (GW.15). Unfortunately, the company that ordered her went bankrupt before she was completed, so she was bought by Robert Alfred Colby Cubbin, who spent £30,000 converting her into a yacht under the same name, registered at Douglas, Isle of Man.

On the outbreak of World War II in September 1939, Glen Strathallan was requisitioned by the Royal Navy. As the Armed Yacht HMS Glen Strathallan (FY–010) she served as an anti-submarine vessel until late 1945.

Returned to Colby Cubbin, she was used for cruises between the Isle of Man and Scotland until his death in 1955. Under the terms of his will she then served as the training ship T/S Glen Strathallan at King Edward VII Nautical College, training future officers of the Merchant Navy until 1970.

The elderly ship had her main engine removed (it was acquired by the Science museum and was on display at the Science Museum in London from 1978 until 2004. It now resides in the museum's storage facility) and she was scuttled about 200 yards from the Shagstone on 27 April 1970. Intended to be used as a diver training site, she was sunk in shallow water, but soon found to be obstructing the entrance to the port and was dispersed using explosives. The wreck is considerably broken up, but the boilers remain and are currently home to a number of conger eels.

See also

References

External links
 
 

 

1928 ships
Shipwrecks in the English Channel
Wreck diving sites in England
Ships sunk as dive sites
Ships built in Selby
Maritime incidents in 1970
1970 in England
1928 in England
Auxiliary ships of the Royal Navy